The UEFA Europa League, formerly the UEFA Cup, is an association football competition established in 1971 by UEFA. It is considered the second most important international competition for European clubs, after the UEFA Champions League. Clubs qualify for the Europa League based on their performance in national leagues and cup competitions. For the first 25 years of the competition, the final was contested over two legs, one at each participating club's stadium, but in 1998, Inter Milan defeated Lazio in the competition's first single-legged final held at a neutral venue, the Parc des Princes in Paris. Tottenham Hotspur won the inaugural competition in 1972, defeating Wolverhampton Wanderers 3–2 on aggregate. Ten finals have featured teams from the same national association: Italy (1990, 1991, 1995 and 1998), Spain (2007 and 2012), England (1972 and 2019), Germany (1980) and Portugal (2011).

Sevilla holds the record for the most victories, having won the competition six times since its inception. Real Madrid (winners in 1985 and 1986) and Sevilla (winners in 2006 and 2007, and 2014, 2015 and 2016) are the only teams to have retained their title. The competition has been won thirteen times by teams from Spain, more than any other country. The last champions before the UEFA Cup was renamed to UEFA Europa League were Shakhtar Donetsk, who beat Werder Bremen 2–1 after extra time in the 2009 final. Benfica and Marseille have lost the most finals, with three losses in the competition. The current champions are Eintracht Frankfurt, who defeated Rangers 5–4 on penalties in the 2022 final.

While the Inter-Cities Fairs Cup is considered to be the predecessor to the UEFA Cup, UEFA does not recognise the Fairs Cup as one of its official club competitions, and therefore its records are not included in the list.

List of finals

 The "Season" column refers to the season during which the competition was held, and links to the article about that season.
 The two-legged final matches are listed in the order they were played.
 The "UCL" note by a team means that the team initially competed in the UEFA Champions League for that season (since the 1999–2000 season).
 The link in the "Score" column directs to the article about that season's final.

Performances

By club

By nation

See also
List of UEFA Cup and Europa League winning managers
List of European Cup and UEFA Champions League finals
List of UEFA Cup Winners' Cup finals
List of UEFA Super Cup matches
List of UEFA Intertoto Cup winners

Notes

References

External links
UEFA Europa League official history

 
 
Finals
UEFA Cup and UEFA Europa League